"Destruction" is a song by American indie rock band Joywave. It was released as a single from their debut studio album, How Do You Feel Now?, on March 30, 2015. A music video for the song was released on January 13, 2016 through YouTube. "Destruction" peaked at number 18 on the Billboard Alternative Songs chart and was featured on the soundtrack for the video games Madden NFL 16 and the 2015 Need for Speed reboot.  An abridged version, consisting of just the first verse, chorus and outro, was used for the launch trailer for Fortnite Battle Royale.

Music video
The official music video for "Destruction" was released on the band's YouTube channel on January 13, 2016. It was directed by Philip Andelman and produced by Aviv Russ and Joywave. The video follows the band as they hold auditions for a new member, eventually finding an MP3 player as the right choice. They enter recording sessions together and set off on a tour as well, until the MP3 player goes solo, eventually leaving Joywave out of the limelight. Nina Corcoran of Nerdist complimented the video, calling it "clever both in its conception and creation."

Track listing

Charts

References

2015 singles
2015 songs
Hollywood Records singles
Music videos directed by Philip Andelman